Yogesh Mohan Tiwari  was an Indian diplomat. He was an officer of the Indian Foreign Service 1966 batch. He was a graduate of Government Science College, Jabalpur and St Stephen's College, Delhi. He served as India's ambassador to Singapore, Cyprus, Austria, Slovenia, Kenya and Eritrea. He also served as India's permanent representative to the IAEA and UNIDO in Vienna.
His elder brother was Vishwa Mohan Tiwari, a retired air vice marshal, Indian Air Force. Ambassador Tiwari died in December 2019.

References

1943 births
Place of birth missing (living people)
Living people
Indian Foreign Service officers
20th-century Indian engineers
High Commissioners of India to Singapore
High Commissioners of India to Cyprus
High Commissioners of India to Kenya
Ambassadors of India to Austria